Agrupación Social Trabajadores Armeros, S.A.L. (ASTAR), was a Spanish firearms company.

STAR Firearms' remaining company assets were merged with Astra Firearms. The new company began making weapons under the name ASTAR.

Another semi-merger, an employee driven one, occurred with IPAR Guns in Eibar, a company which produces spare parts for some STAR and ASTRA guns and also services them. ASTAR's products have not been offered for sale in the United States.

See also
Astra-Unceta y Cia SA, another former Spanish handgun manufacturer
CETME
Llama

References

External links
 Star-Firearms.com, an information website
 9 mm Largo website
 Modern Firearms - Handguns

Defunct manufacturing companies of Spain
Defunct firearms manufacturers
Firearm manufacturers of Spain
Spanish companies established in 1997